Aeronáutica (also known as Gira Globo Aeronáutica after its parent company) was an airline based in Luanda, Angola, operating domestic chartered freight and passenger flights out of Quatro de Fevereiro Airport, Luanda.

History
The airline was established in 2001 and is wholly owned by GVA-Investimentos, SARL. Due to safety concerns, the company (along with all other Angolan airlines, except TAAG) has been banned from operating within the European Union. Meanwhile, the airline ceased operations.

Fleet
The Aeronáutica fleet included the following aircraft (at March 2007):

 1 Antonov An-32
 1 Raytheon Beech King Air 200
 1 Raytheon Beech King Air B200
 1 Ilyushin Il-76

References 

Defunct airlines of Angola
Airlines established in 2001